Gorron is a commune in the Mayenne department in north-western France.
It has a twin town in the UK, Hayling Island, as well as a twin town in Germany, Schwaikheim. There are a range of shops and services to be found in Gorron. The river Colmont runs through it. There is a regular market in the town every Wednesday.

See also
Communes of the Mayenne department
Nicholas of Gorran

References

Communes of Mayenne
Maine (province)